The Micius Quantum Prize is awarded every year since 2018 "for promoting the quantum information science and technology research". The recipients are awarded one million Chinese yuan (about 150,000 US dollars) and a gold medal. The prize is awarded by the Micius quantum foundation, which was established thanks to donations (with a sum of 100 million Chinese yuan) from private entrepreneurs. Chair of the selection committee is Chunli Bai, the president of the Chinese Academy of Science.

The prize is named after Mozi, an ancient Chinese philosopher (~400 B.C) who founded the school of Mohism during the Hundred Schools of Thought period.

Laureates

References 

Physics awards
Awards established in 2018